CollegeDekho is a platform for discovering education opportunities that links potential students with colleges. Its objective is to assist students in making decisions regarding both the college and the course they want to pursue. It is headquartered in Gurugram, Haryana and was founded in 2015 by Ruchir Arora, Saurabh Jain and Rohit Saha.

History
CollegeDekho was founded in 2015 by Ruchir Arora, Saurabh Jain and Rohit Saha. In 2019, the company acquired overseas admission consulting firm Scholarship Facilitation Services (SFS) in a stock-and-cash deal. In July 2022, CollegeDekho, launched CollegeDekho Assured, an online learning platform offering a series of live and interactive courses across multiple streams. As of January 2023, the company claims to have counselled more than 75 lakh students and has helped more than 1500 colleges with their student recruitment. They have also enrolled over 1.30 Lakh students on its various platforms.

Funding
CollegeDekho is backed by investors like Winter Capital, ETS Strategic Capital – the private equity investments arm of ETS, Calega, Man Capital, Disrupt ADQ and QIC.

Operation
CollegeDekho functions as a bridge between education seekers and education providers and offers information about colleges, courses, entrance exams, admission notifications, scholarship opportunities, and other related topics. The platform also provides a Common Application Form feature, which allows students to apply to multiple colleges with one click. In addition, for students looking to study abroad, CollegeDekho assists with profile building, test preparation, university selection, and visa support.

References

Educational websites
Educational technology companies
Education companies of India
Indian companies established in 2015